Alan Charles Bird (28 September 1906 – 21 July 1962) was an Australian politician. Born in Launceston, Tasmania, he was educated at state primary schools in Melbourne and at Melbourne High School before becoming an engineer. As an official with the Amalgamated Engineers' Union, he was associated with the Australian Labor Party.

Bird was elected to Northcote City Council in 1930 at the age of only twenty-four and served continuously on the Council for the remainder of his life. Twice (in 1940–1941, and again in 1958–1959) he served as Northcote's mayor. He was elected to the Australian House of Representatives in 1949 as the Labor member for Batman. The demands made by Bird's concurrent service on both Northcote Council and the federal parliament were certainly prejudicial to his health. He died in July 1962.

References

Australian Labor Party members of the Parliament of Australia
Members of the Australian House of Representatives for Batman
Members of the Australian House of Representatives
1906 births
1962 deaths
People educated at Melbourne High School
20th-century Australian politicians